Trachea delicata is a species of cutworm or dart moth in the family Noctuidae that occurs in North America.

The MONA or Hodges number for Trachea delicata is 9626.

References

Further reading

 
 
 

Noctuinae
Articles created by Qbugbot
Moths described in 1874